Steven Hartley (born 12 August 1960, in Shipley) is an English actor who has appeared in television, film, and theatre.

Early life
Hartley grew up in Yorkshire.

Professional career 
Hartley has appeared and performed in episodes in shows such as Rumble, Strictly Confidential, Badboys, Trial & Retribution, Sharman, Holby City, Casualty, Doctors, The Cut, Married... with Children,  Ripper Street. He also appeared as regular characters in The Bill and EastEnders. He has appeared in  Silent Witness, the series Sky TV Brassic, Shadow and Bone for Netflix,  All Creatures Great and Small and Grace.

His films include Allies (2014)  Ruby Strangelove (2015), Robocroc (2013), Jet Stream (2013), The Walker (2007), A Dog of Flanders (1999), Christopher Columbus: The Discovery (1992), Split Second (1992), anf Young Toscanini (1988). 
Hartley's theatre work includes reprising his role as Bill Sikes in the West End Musical Oliver! in 2009-2010 for producer Cameron Mackintosh, the third time Hartley has played the role since being cast by director Sam Mendes in 1996 and played a leading role in the play Fit and Proper People for the Royal Shakespeare Company at the Soho Theatre.

Hartley has voice acted on video games including Sony Studios' Blood & Truth on PSVR as Tony Sharp, as Luis Belosa in Squadron 42 alongside an all-star cast, including Gary Oldman, Gillian Anderson, Mark Strong and Mark Hamill, voices for Greedfall, The Witcher 3: Wild Hunt (Eredin king of the wild hunt), and Zynbel in the BAFTA award-winning game Hellblade: Senua's Sacrifice. He also has roles in Sword Coast Legends , Dark Souls III,  Nioh 2, Sea of Thieves.

In 2005, he was nominated for Sexiest Male at The British Soap Awards.  

For two-and-a-half years, Hartley appeared as Tom Chandler in The Bill.

Voice-overs
Hartley has been "The Voice" of TalkSPORT radio station. He has voiced and starred in over 20 video games, including Eredin in  The Witcher 3: Wild Hunt, Larethar Gulgrin in Sword Coast Legends, Sir Vilhelm in Dark Souls III: Ashes of Ariandel, Shibata Katsuie in Nioh 2 (English dub), and Zynbel in Hellblade: Senua's Sacrifice and Petrus in Greedfall.  He has recently completed video games Squadron 42 and Blood & Truth as gangster Anthony Sharpe.

Personal life
He was also a committed marathon and half-marathon runner with the TV Times Leukaemia research team. He has a brother and a sister. Steven currently lives in Tunbridge Wells with his wife, actress Abby Francis, and daughter.

Filmography
 Out of Order as CID 1987
 EastEnders as Matthew Jackson (1988–1989)
 Christopher Columbus: The Discovery opposite Marlon Brando and Catherine Zeta Jones (1992)
 A Dog of Flanders with Jon Voight
 Chernobyl - Final Warning with Jon Voight
 Young Toscanini (original title Il giovane Toscanini)
 Split Second opposite Rutger Hauer
 Holby City
 Rumble TV
 Married... with Children, episode "England Show" 1992
 Doctors (2004–2005) as Jack Ford
 Paul Schrader's The Walker as Robbie Kononsberg alongside Woody Harrelson Kristen Scott Thomas and Willem Dafoe (2006)
 Casualty
 The Bill (as Superintendent Tom Chandler) (2000-2002)
 The Cut as 'Little' Joey Horton (2009–2010)
 Ripper Street as Det. Sgt. Maurice Linklater, episode "Pure as the Driven" (2013)
 Jet Stream TV Film (as Jack) (2013)
 Allies (as Brigadier General Groves) (2014)
 Silent Witness as Terry Fallon (2007–2015)
 Happy Valley as Cllr Marcus Gascoigne (2014)
 Ruby Strangelove: Young Witch as Principle Maquire (2015)
 Brassic as Russell Hardwicke
 Shadow and Bone (TV series)  As Commander Chalikov 2020
 Grace (TV series). As Sean Klinger 2022
 All Creatures Great and Small (TV series) As John Monkham 2021

Theatre
Sam Mendes' production of Oliver! as Bill Sikes (1996)
Insignificance for director Rupert Goold (The Ballplayer opposite Gina Bellman)
Played Dr. Jake Houseman in Dirty Dancing: The Musical
Played Bill Sikes in the West End production of Oliver! at Theatre Royal Drury Lane (2009)
Played in Fit and Proper People for the "Royal Shakespeare Company" (2011)

References

External links
 

 Voice samples at Yakety Yak All Mouth

English male soap opera actors
Alumni of the London Academy of Music and Dramatic Art
People from Shipley, West Yorkshire
Male actors from Bradford
Male actors from Yorkshire
1960 births
Living people